The Katandra Football Netball Club, nicknamed the Kats, is an Australian rules football and netball club based in the small Victorian town of Katandra West. The club teams currently compete in the Picola & District Football League.

History 
After much talk in the district for many years the Katandra Football club was founded in 1911. Their first opponents were Rockville and Pine Grove.

Reforming after World War I in the 1922 the club played in a small local association centered around Dookie. The small completion lasted until the height of the depression before taking a break for a few years. In 1936 the reformed to play in a competition with the small towns around Shepparton until the outbreak of World War II.

Despite the blemish of 2012, the club has experienced success over the past decade. Winning premierships in all grades of football and many grades of netball. The most recent Senior premiership was in 2004. The A Grade netball team won their first premiership in 2009 and were able to follow this by being Runners Up in 2011 and winning the 2012 pennant. The Senior team recently completed a remarkable feat of completing 8 seasons with no worse finish than being Preliminary Finalists. This 8 season streak included 2 Premierships, 3 Runners Up and 3 Preliminary Finals losses. Unfortunately, the proud club has not competed in finals since 2010 and received its first wooden spoon in 2012 after finishing last in the eight team PDFL-South East competition.

Past players to play AFL include Footscray ruckman Les Bartlett, Melbourne tough man Rod Grinter and Carlton best and fairest winner, David Teague.

The club changed leagues following an administration disagreement between the AFL Goulburn-Valley and the Picola & District Football League. The club wanted to remain under the AFL umbrella for player development and insurance so they joined the Murray Football League. They rejoined the Picola & District Football League in 2020.

Football competitions timeline
Katandra FC have played in the following football competitions.
1936: Goulburn Valley Second Eighteens Football Association
1937: Goulburn Valley Football Association

Football Premierships
Seniors
 Picola & District Football League (3):
 1998, 2003, 2004
 Tungamah Football League (8):
 1973, 1974, 1975, 1977, 1983, 1984, 1990, 1992
 Benalla Tungamah Football League (5):
 1955, 1956, 1957, 1958, 1966
 Central Goulburn Valley Football League (2):
 1950, 1951

Football – Runners up
Seniors
The club was runner-up in the –

Picola & District Football League
 2006, 2007, 2008 
Tungamah Football League 
 1970, 1971, 1972, 1989, 1991 
Benalla Tungamah Football League 
 1960 
Central Goulburn Valley Football League
 1952
Goulburn Valley Football League
 1939, 1940

Wooden Spoons
Picola & District Football League (1):
2012

Football League: Best & Fairest winners
Seniors
Goulburn Valley Football Association
1940 – Sandy McIntosh 
Benalla Tungamah Football League – Lawless Medal
1956 – Harry Brittain

AFL players
These Katandra players made their VFL / AFL debut in the following years –

 1942 – Eddie Ford, Richmond
 1945 – Stan Le Lievre, St Kilda
 1968 – Les Bartlett, Footscray
 1972 – Lloyd Burgmann, Melbourne
 1985 – Rod Grinter, Melbourne
 1993 – Derek Hall, West Coast and Geelong
 2001 – David Teague (footballer), North Melbourne & Carlton

References

External links
 
 Gameday website

Picola & District Football League clubs
Australian rules football clubs in Victoria (Australia)
1911 establishments in Australia
Australian rules football clubs established in 1911
Sports clubs established in 1911
Netball teams in Victoria (Australia)